Qi Dayu (born September 1963) is a Chinese diplomat currently serving as Chinese Ambassador to Hungary. Previously he served as Communist Party Secretary of China Foreign Affairs University and before that, Chinese Ambassador to Kyrgyzstan.

Biography
Qi was born in Andong (now Dandong), Liaoning, in September 1963. In 1986, he graduated from Nanjing University, where he majored in Russian. 

Qi joined the Foreign Service in 1986 and has served primarily in the Department of Eurasia, Ministry of Foreign Affairs. He was first posted abroad in 1996, to be a secretary at the Chinese Embassy in Russia. He was counsellor of the Chinese Embassy in Georgia from 2001 to 2005. In March 2017, he became Communist Party Secretary of China Foreign Affairs University, a post he kept until October 2020, when he was appointed Chinese Ambassador to Hungary.

References

1963 births
Living people
People from Dandong
Nanjing University alumni
Moscow State University alumni
Peking University alumni
Ambassadors of China to Kyrgyzstan
Ambassadors of China to Hungary